India "Willie" Bush (July 13, 1990 – January 4, 2009) was a black  Shorthair cat owned by former U.S. President George W. Bush and First Lady Laura Bush. She lived with the Bush family for almost two decades.

Biography
The Bushes acquired India, an all-black, female American Shorthair, in late 1991 or 1992 when their twin daughters Barbara and Jenna Bush were nine years old. India remained with George and Laura Bush once their daughters left for college. The cat moved with the Bushes to the White House from the Texas Governor's Mansion in Austin in early 2001 following Bush's inauguration as President.

Despite living at the White House with the First Family, India had been largely overshadowed in the media by two of the Bushes' higher profile Scottish terriers, Barney and Miss Beazley. However, she's seen in the "Barneycam" videos produced by the White House staff around Christmas time, her first being Where in the White House is Miss Beazley?, where she was referred to as "Willie". The dogs received significantly more media attention from the White House press corps during the Bush presidency.

The Bush family cat made an appearance in the March 2008 Architectural Digest, as "Willie", in the East Sitting Hall of the White House.

India died at the White House on January 4, 2009, at the age of 18. In a statement to the press regarding India's death, a spokesperson for First Lady observed that the family was "deeply saddened by their cat's death", and went on to say "India was a beloved member of the Bush family for almost two decades. She will be greatly missed."

Controversy in India
There was some controversy reported in India as some people were upset with the cat's name. In July 2004, demonstrators in the southern Keralian city of Thiruvananthapuram denounced the cat's name as an insult to the nation of India, and burned an effigy of President Bush in protest. The Bushes did not change the cat's name in response to the demonstrations, as their cat had been named after the baseball player Rubén Sierra, who was nicknamed "El Indio" during his time with the Texas Rangers when Bush owned the team. The name "India" had reportedly been given to the family cat by their daughter Barbara Bush.

See also
United States presidential pets
List of individual cats

References

External links

 Official Biography at WhiteHouse.gov
 India at the Presidential Pet Museum

1990 animal births
2009 animal deaths
George W. Bush administration controversies
India–United States relations
United States presidential cats